Theridion ceylonicus, is a species of spider of the genus Theridion. It is endemic to Sri Lanka.

Homonym 
Theridion annulipes O. Pickard-Cambridge, 1869

See also 
 List of Theridiidae species

References

Theridiidae
Endemic fauna of Sri Lanka
Spiders of Asia
Spiders described in 2009